Shebeli Tower is a historical tower in Damavand, a city situated in the Tehran Province of Iran. 

A sirdāb (basement) also exists under the structure.

The structure is a remnant of the Samanid era, dating it to the 12th century at the latest.  Shebeli Tower is similar in design to extant structures in Bukhara.

The structure recently underwent some preservations.

See also
Iranian architecture
Tehran Province
Damavand
Sufism
Mount Damavand

References

Towers completed in the 12th century
Sufi shrines
Architecture in Iran
Buildings and structures in Tehran Province
Towers in Iran
Tombs in Iran